"Hurricane" is a song by American hip hip group The Click. It is the lead single released from their second album, Game Related. Produced by Studio Ton, the song became The Click's most successful single, peaking at number 63 on the Billboard Hot 100 and number four on the Billboard Hot Rap Singles. The song's title comes from the alcoholic drink of the same name.

Track listing

A-Side
"Hurricane" (LP Version) - 4:21
"Hurricane" (Instrumental) - 4:18
"Hurricane" (Acapella) - 4:19

B-Side
"Hurricane" (Remix) - 4:24
"Hurricane" (Remix Instrumental) - 4:23
"Actin' Bad" - 4:26

Charts

Weekly charts

Year-end charts

References

1995 singles
1995 songs
Jive Records singles
Songs written by E-40